Cam Ly Airport  is a small abandoned airport outside of Da Lat in Lâm Đồng Province in the Central Highlands region of Vietnam. It is the former site of Vietnamese National Military Academy. It was mainly used for military purposes and also served small aircraft including sport airplanes and helicopters.

See also

 List of airports in Vietnam

Airports in Vietnam
Defunct airports in Vietnam
Buildings and structures in Lâm Đồng province